Kristina Matisic (born December 26, 1968)  is the host, with Anna Wallner, of The Shopping Bags, Anna & Kristina's Grocery Bag, and Anna & Kristina's Beauty Call.

Matisic was born in Zagreb, Croatia. She has a bachelor's degree in history from the University of British Columbia and a master's degree in broadcast journalism from the University of Southern California.

In 1993, Matisic started her career in broadcasting as a news announcer on Mountain FM. The following year, she began working at CKVU-TV in Vancouver, as an overnight news anchor for Global News, an associate producer and a reporter. In 1997, she was the news anchor and producer of that station's 11:30 pm newscast.

Early life

Television career

Broadcasting

Television host and actor

The Shopping Bags
While there , Matisic met Anna Wallner and created The Shopping Bags concept. Their show has won numerous Leo awards and two Gemini award nominations. 
They maintain an extensive website that includes product reviews and shopping tips and they write for numerous publications across North America. They are also co-authors of the book, The Shopping Bags: Tips, Tricks and Inside Information to Make You a Savvy Shopper.

Personal life
Matisic appeared in Final Destination as reporter Marilyn Eckerle. In January 2009, she was living in Vancouver, British Columbia.

Appeared in The Outer Limits, episode Essence of Life as "News Anchor" in 1999. 
Appeared in The Outer Limits, episode Decompression as "Reporter" in 2000.

References

External links

 Anna & Kristina/The Shopping Bags official website
 Kristina's bio on The Shopping Bags official website
 TV show fan page for Anna & Kristina's Grocery Bag on Facebook
 TV show fan page for Anna & Kristina's Beauty Call on Facebook
 TV show fan page for The Shopping Bags on Facebook
 Fan page for Kristina Matisic on Facebook
 Anna & Kristina's photostream on Flickr
 Anna & Kristina's tweets on Twitter
 Anna & Kristina's videos on YouTube
 Excerpt from The Shopping Bags book from Good Morning America

1968 births
Canadian television hosts
Canadian women television hosts
Croatian emigrants to Canada
Living people
People from Vancouver
USC Annenberg School for Communication and Journalism alumni
University of British Columbia alumni